The 2001 Algarve Cup was the eighth edition of the Algarve Cup, an invitational women's association football tournament. It took place between 11 and 17 March 2001 in Portugal with Sweden winning the event defeating Denmark, 3-0, in the final game.

Format 
The eight participating teams are same as previous year:
Canada,
China,
Denmark,
Finland,
Norway,
Portugal,
Sweden and the
United States.

The eight teams were split into two groups that played a round-robin group stage. On completion of this, the fourth
placed teams from each group would playoff to determine seventh and eighth place, the third placed teams from each group would play each other to decide fifth and sixth place, the second placed teams in each group would play to determine third and fourth place and the winners of the groups would compete for first and second place.

Points awarded in the group stage are three points for a win, one point for a draw and none for a loss.

Group A

Group B

Seventh place

Fifth place

Third place

Final

Final standings

Champion

Goal scorers

References

External links 
 2001 Algarve Cup on RSSSF

2001
2001 in women's association football
2000–01 in Portuguese football
2001 in Swedish women's football
2000–01 in Danish women's football
2001 in Canadian soccer
2001 in American women's soccer
2001 in Chinese football
2001 in Norwegian women's football
2001 in Finnish football
March 2001 sports events in Europe
2001 in Portuguese women's sport